Waukeenah is an unincorporated community and census-designated place (CDP) in Jefferson County, Florida, United States. As of the 2020 census, the population was 259.

Geography
Waukeenah is located at  (30.4111, -83.9531), near the intersection of US 27/State Road 20 and County Road 259.

Waukeenah was once a resting point for travelers using the Old St. Augustine road, which started in St. Augustine and went to Pensacola, Florida.

John G. Gamble's plantation was named Joaquina in honor of a Spanish descent lady who lived in Pensacola. The post office established at the plantation was moved to the crossing of Tallahassee and St. Augustine Roads in 1841.  First called Marion Cross Road (Marion Post Office) until 1850 when the settlement there was once again named Joaquina, but this time the spelling was Anglicized into Waukeenah.   

Education
Jefferson County Schools operates public schools, including Jefferson County Middle / High School.

Demographics

References

Unincorporated communities in Jefferson County, Florida
Tallahassee metropolitan area
Unincorporated communities in Florida
Census-designated places in Florida